Money EP is an EP by Ringside. It  was released for free on their website on October 10, 2010 (see 2010 in music.)

Track listing
"Money" - 2:55
"Kiss You Red" - 4:04
"First Day" - 3:29
"Chamberlain" - 3:12
"Midnight After" - 3:54
"Coastal" - 3:52

2010 EPs
Ringside albums